McCairn-Turner House, also known as the Gilman-Turner House, is a historic home located at Goodland, Indiana.  The original section was built about 1869, received an addition about 1875, and renovated in the Italianate style in 1886–1887.  It is a two-story, frame dwelling sheathed in clapboard siding. A kitchen addition was constructed in 1908.  It features a two-story, three sided projecting bay and one-story full length porch.

It was listed on the National Register of Historic Places in 1994.

References

Houses on the National Register of Historic Places in Indiana
Italianate architecture in Indiana
Houses completed in 1887
Buildings and structures in Newton County, Indiana
National Register of Historic Places in Newton County, Indiana